Don Batory is an American computer scientist, currently the David Bruton, Jr. Centennial Professor at University of Texas at Austin.

Don Batory was the first person to receive the most influential paper award which was established by the Software Product Line Conference in 2016 

He received a B.S. (1975) and M.Sc. (1977) degrees from Case Institute of Technology, and a Ph.D. (1980) from the University of Toronto. He was a faculty member at the University of Florida in 1981 before he joined the University of Texas in 1983. He was Associate Editor of IEEE Transactions on Software Engineering (1999-2002), Associate Editor of ACM Transactions on Database Systems (1986-1992), member of the ACM Software Systems Award Committee (1989-1993; Committee Chairman in 1992), Program Co-Chair for the 2002 Generative Programming and Component Engineering Conference. He is a proponent of Feature Oriented Software Development (FOSD).

References

Year of birth missing (living people)
Living people
American computer scientists
University of Texas at Austin faculty